Mama Natung is an Indian businessman and politician From The Bharatiya Janata Party.

Natung was elected unopposed from the Seppa West seat in the 2014 Arunachal Pradesh Legislative Assembly election, standing as an Indian National Congress candidate.

References

Indian National Congress politicians
Living people
People's Party of Arunachal politicians
Arunachal Pradesh MLAs 2014–2019
Year of birth missing (living people)